The men's 10,000 metres event at the 2008 World Junior Championships in Athletics was held in Bydgoszcz, Poland, at Zawisza Stadium on 9 July.

Medalists

Results

Final
9 July

Participation
According to an unofficial count, 22 athletes from 15 countries participated in the event.

References

10,000 metres
Long distance running at the World Athletics U20 Championships